Robert Franklin Beckham (May 6, 1837 – December 5, 1864) was a young artillery officer who commanded a horse artillery battalion under J.E.B. Stuart and in the Army of Tennessee. He was mortally wounded at Columbia, before the Battle of Franklin on November 29, 1864.

Early life
Beckham was born in Culpeper, Virginia. He graduated from the United States Military Academy at West Point as a member of the class of 1859. Beckham ranked 6th in his class of 22. He then served as a lieutenant in the United States Engineers until 1861 and the outbreak of the Civil War.

Civil War
When the Civil War began, Beckham commanded an artillery battery which he led at the First Battle of Bull Run. He then joined the staff of General Gustavus W. Smith in January 1862, playing a key role at the Battle of Seven Pines. Beckham was subsequently elected captain of the Jeff Davis Artillery on March 31, 1862 but did not accept, continuing to serve as an ordnance office at the rank of major. Upon Stuart's request, Beckham was assigned to command the Stuart Horse Artillery after the death of Major John Pelham on April 8, 1863.

Beckham was a personally brave officer who earned the approval of Stonewall Jackson at the Battle of Chancellorsville and a commendation for gallantry from Stuart at the Battle of Brandy Station. He was also a capable administrator, earning the praise of Stuart in administering his batteries and refitting them.

In February 1864, Beckham was transferred west to command the artillery of the II Corps of the Army of Tennessee. He was promoted to colonel. While in command of the artillery, he was mortally wounded while commanding his guns at Columbia, the day before the Battle of Franklin, on November 29, 1864, dying several days later on December 5.  He was buried in St. John's Churchyard in Ashwood, Tennessee.

References
 Krick, Robert K. Lee's Colonels: A Biographical Register of the Field Officers of the Army of Northern Virginia, Morningside Bookshop, Dayton, Ohio (1979).
 Sifakis, Stewart.  Who Was Who in the Civil War, Facts on File, New York (1988).
 Wise, Jennings Croppe. The Long Arm of Lee: The History of the Artillery of the Army of Northern Virginia.

External links
 

1837 births
1864 deaths
Confederate States Army officers
United States Military Academy alumni
Confederate States of America military personnel killed in the American Civil War